An indirect presidential election was held in Hungary on 10 March 2022. Katalin Novák became the first female President of Hungary after winning an absolute majority. 

Incumbent president of the Republic János Áder was ineligible to run due to term limits. There were two candidates for the largely ceremonial post. The governing alliance, Fidesz-KDNP nominated Katalin Novák, the former minister for Family Affairs and an ally of Hungarian Prime Minister Viktor Orbán, as its presidential candidate. The opposition alliance, United for Hungary nominated Péter Róna, a lawyer and economist as its presidential candidate.

Electoral system 
Under the current Constitution of Hungary adopted by the Fidesz–KDNP government coalition in 2011, the President must be elected in a secret ballot by the Members of Parliament, no sooner than sixty but no later than thirty days before expiry of the mandate of the previous office-holder, or if his or her mandate terminated prematurely, within thirty days of the termination. The constitution authorizes the Speaker of the National Assembly to set the date for the election.

A presidential candidate needs the written nomination of at least one-fifth of the Members of Parliament (thus about 40 MPs), who may not nominate more than one candidate. In the first round of the election, a two-thirds majority of all incumbent MPs is required to elect the president. If this condition is not fulfilled, a second round is held between the two candidates who received the highest and second highest numbers of votes in the first round. A simple majority of the voting MPs is then sufficient.

Background 

The opposition Democratic Coalition (DK) is re-submitting an amendment proposal to postpone the parliamentary election of Hungary's president until after the parliamentary election in the spring of 2022, the party said on 5 August 2021.

Since 1990, there have been no more than two candidates in any presidential election held in Hungary.

Candidates

Result

References

2022 elections in Europe
Presidential election
March 2022 events in Hungary
2022